Alexander Laukart (born 25 October 1998) is a German professional football who plays as a midfielder for Union Titus Pétange.

Club career
Laukart made his Eredivisie debut for FC Twente on 13 August 2017 in a game against Feyenoord.

References

External links
 
 

Living people
1998 births
Footballers from Hamburg
German footballers
Association football midfielders
Germany youth international footballers
FC Twente players
Jong FC Twente players
FC Den Bosch players
Türkgücü München players
Union Titus Pétange players
Eredivisie players
Eerste Divisie players
German expatriate footballers
German expatriate sportspeople in the Netherlands
Expatriate footballers in the Netherlands
German expatriate sportspeople in Luxembourg
Expatriate footballers in Luxembourg